was a town located in Makabe District, Ibaraki Prefecture, Japan.

As of 2003, the town had an estimated population of 19,368 and a density of 305.49 persons per km². The total area was 63.40 km².

On October 1, 2005, Makabe, along with the village of Yamato (also from Makabe District), and the town of Iwase (from Nishiibaraki District), was merged to create the city of Sakuragawa.

See also
Groups of Traditional Buildings

External links
 Sakuragawa official website 

Dissolved municipalities of Ibaraki Prefecture
Sakuragawa, Ibaraki